Nello Olivo is an estate California vineyard operator whose award-winning wines brought global recognition for the wines of the El Dorado in California.

Biography
Nello Olivo was born in Santa Clara County, California to a family of 16 children. His grandfather Enrico was born in Todi, Umbria, Italy in 1879, with all his other grandparents being from Spain
Olivo has brought unique Italian grape varieties to the California wine region and has worked with the University of California, Davis on bringing the rare Sagrantino to the United States. His Sangiovese was the winner of the 2010 California State Fair and his Petite Sirah was award the prestigious Best In Class at the 2011 California State Fair.

Family History
Nello Olivo is the husband of actress Danica d'Hondt, father of actress America Olivo, and father-in-law to actor Christian Campbell.

See also
List of wine personalities

References

External links
Nello Olivo official site
 

Special Collections Dept., University Library, University of California, Davis
 

American winemakers
Wine merchants
Viticulturists
Wineries in Napa Valley
American people of Italian descent
People from Santa Clara County, California
Living people
People from El Dorado County, California
Year of birth missing (living people)